Sebastian Kurowski (born January 30, 1988 in Gorlice) is a Polish footballer who last played for Cracovia in the Polish Ekstraklasa.

Career

Club
He was released from Cracovia on 16 June 2011.

References

External links
 

1988 births
Living people
Polish footballers
Association football forwards
Kolejarz Stróże players
MKS Cracovia (football) players
Ekstraklasa players
People from Gorlice
Sportspeople from Lesser Poland Voivodeship
Glinik Gorlice players